Brigadier General Hector E. Pagan (born 1957) is a United States Army officer who is the first Hispanic of Puerto Rican descent to become Deputy Commanding General of the U.S.Army John F. Kennedy Special Warfare Center and School at Fort Bragg, North Carolina.

Early years
Pagan's parents moved to New York City in search of a better way of life. He was born in Manhattan, N.Y. and raised in Puerto Rico. He was commissioned as an infantry officer from the ROTC program at the University of Puerto Rico at the Mayagüez campus upon his graduation in 1979, where he was a distinguished student and graduate.

Military career
He attended the Infantry Officers Basic Course and Ranger School in 1980, and was assigned to the 1st Battalion, 51st Infantry, in Germany, as a Rifle Platoon Leader, Company Executive Officer and Scout Platoon Leader.

In 1983, he attended the Infantry Officers Advanced Course and remained at Fort Benning, Georgia, with the Infantry Training Group and the 29th Infantry Regiment, where he served as chief, Special Weapons Committee, operations officer, and commanded the Headquarters and Headquarters Company, 2nd Bn., 29th Infantry Regiment from 1984 to 1986. He volunteered to attend Special Forces training and was assigned to 7th Special Forces Group (Airborne).

Pagan served in Panama with the 3rd Bn., 7th Special Forces Group (Airborne), 1988–1990, as an A-Detachment commander and Battalion S1. He served in Operation Just Cause which was the invasion of Panama by the United States that deposed general, dictator and de facto Panamanian military leader Manuel Noriega in December 1989, during the administration of U.S. President George H. W. Bush, and later that same year was deployed to El Salvador. From 1990 to 1992, he served in Special Forces Branch, Total Army Personnel Command as a future readiness officer and captains assignments officer.

He attended the Army Command and General Staff Course and then served as the executive officer, 1st Bn., 7th SF Group
(Airborne). From 1994 to 1995, he served in the U.S. Army Special Operations Command as the chief, officer management, office of the deputy chief of staff for personnel. He returned to the 7th SF Group (Airborne) in 1995, where he served as group operations officer, executive officer and deputy commander. From 1998 to 2000, Pagan commanded the 2nd Battalion, 1st SF Group (Airborne) at Fort Lewis, Washington. After his tour with the 1st SF Group, he was assigned to the Special Operations Command South, Naval Station Roosevelt Roads, Puerto Rico, where he served as the director of operations, J3, from 2000 to 2002. Here he earned the Navy Meritorious Unit Commendation.

Upon completion of the U.S. Army War College in 2003, Pagan took command of the 5th SF Group (Airborne) in Baghdad, Iraq, Operation Iraqi Freedom. He led the 5th SF Group (Airborne) in combat as the commander of the Combined Joint Special Operations Task Force in the Arabian Peninsula for two combat tours in 2003 and 2004.

In 2005, Pagan served as the special assistant to the commander of the United States Special Operations Command at MacDill Air Force Base, Florida. In 2006, he assumed duties as the deputy director of the Operations Support Group in the Center for Special Operations in the U.S. Special
Operations Command. Pagan became the deputy commander, U.S. Army Special Operations Command in November 2006 and in May 2007 assumed duties as deputy commander, U.S. Army John F. Kennedy Special Warfare Center at Fort Bragg, North Carolina.

Promotion to Brigadier General

On September 27, 2007, Pagan was promoted to Brigadier General at a ceremony held at the Fort Bragg Officers Club. Major General James Parker, the commander of the John F. Kennedy Special Warfare Center and School and Pagan's wife, Elizabeth, pinned the stars on his shoulders. Also present were ROTC classmates, a friend from Chile, family members from Puerto Rico and a South Korean brigadier general and Admiral Eric T. Olson, commander of U.S. Special Operations Command at MacDill Air Force Base in Tampa, Florida. Pagan was quoted as saying:

I am grateful to a nation, an Army, that allows a guy like me to be a general officer one day", Pagan said. "I am grateful for the great soldiers I have served with during the years I have been in the Army, mostly in Special Forces, exceptional men, like the ones we've lost in Iraq where we served with 5th Special Forces Group. I carry their memories with me every day of my life.

Special Operations Command South

In 2008, Pagan was selected to head U.S. Special Operations Forces throughout Latin America and the Caribbean as commander of Special Operations Command South (SOCSOUTH) at Homestead Air Reserve Base, Florida. Pagan made history yet again as the first commanding officer of Puerto Rican descent to command SOCSOUTH. The command is a subordinate, unified command of U.S. Southern Command, which is based in Doral and oversees U.S. military Special Operations in the region.

Special Operations Command South oversees Special Forces, Civil Affairs, Public Affairs and Psychological Operations missions throughout Latin America and the Caribbean. The command manages more than 200 special operations deployments per year with an average of 42 missions in 26 countries at any given time.

Pagan retired from the Army after a Change Of Command ceremony held 17 September 2010 between himself and RDML Thomas Brown. His career spanned over 30 years.

Military Training
Pagan is a graduate of the Infantry Officer Basic and Advanced Courses, the Combined Arms and Services Staff School, the Special Forces Detachment Officer Qualification Course, the Army Command and General Staff Course, the Joint Forces Staff College and the Army War College.

Personal
The Pagans have a daughter, Karla, a son, Hector, and a niece, Maria, who lives with them. Pagan and his wife became grandparents in 2007. He earned a master's degree in management from Troy State University and a master's degree in strategic studies from the U.S. Army War College.

Military awards and decorations
Among Pagan's military awards and decorations are the following: 
  Defense Superior Service Medal (second award)
  Legion of Merit
  Bronze Star with bronze oak leaf
  Defense Meritorious Service Medal
  Meritorious Service Medal with one silver oak leaf and one bronze oak leaf,
  Army Commendation Medal with bronze oak leaf,
  Army Achievement Medal
  Joint Service Achievement Medal
  Armed Forces Expeditionary Medal with bronze star device,
  Joint Meritorious Unit Award (2nd oak leaf cluster),
  Navy Meritorious Unit Commendation
  National Defense Service Medal
  Army Service Ribbon
  Army Overseas Service Ribbon
Badges
  Combat Infantryman Badge (second award)
  Expert Infantryman Badge
  Master Parachutists Badge
Tabs
  Special Forces Tab
  Ranger Tab

See also

List of Puerto Ricans
List of Puerto Rican military personnel

References

1957 births
Living people
Puerto Rican military officers
Puerto Rican Army personnel
Recipients of the Legion of Merit
United States Army officers
Members of the United States Army Special Forces
United States Army War College alumni
Recipients of the Defense Superior Service Medal
Recipients of the Meritorious Service Medal (United States)